Gokulam Kerala FC Reserves and Academy (Gokulam Kerala FC B) is the reserve team of the Gokulam Kerala, that competes in Kerala Premier League. They won the Kerala Premier League title in 2017–18 and were runners-up in 2018–19, 2019–20.

Reserve team squad

Statistics and records

Top scorer by season

Participations

Honours

League
 Kerala Premier League
Champions (2): 2017–18, 2020–21 
Runners-up (3): 2018–19, 2019–20, 2022–23

Cup
 Bodousa Cup
Champions (1): 2019
 Independence Day Cup
Champions (1): 2019
Mayors Cup
Runners-up (1): 2019

References

Gokulam Kerala FC
Kerala Premier League
Indian reserve football teams